The Amapá Question, known in France as the Franco-Brazilian Dispute (French: Contesté franco-brésilien) was a border dispute involving France and Brazil, in the end of the 19th century, culminating in the French intrusion in Amapá skirmishes in 1895.

Border dispute 
France did not recognize the Oyapock river as the border between French Guiana and the Brazilian province of Amapá, also known as "Brazilian Guyana", claiming for itself part of the territory of the province to the south of the river; a region occupied by French colonists. However, the Utrecht treaty, signed in 1713 between France and Portugal, established the Oyapock as the border between both kingdoms in South America. Brazil alleged it had the right to exercise sovereignty over the region as "heir of the Portuguese Empire".

Intrusion 
The French Intrusion into Amapá took place on 15 May 1895, on the border between the Brazilian Amapá state and French Guiana, the culminating event of the territorial dispute known in Portuguese as the Questão do Amapá (Amapá Question). This event was marked by the invasion of French troops in Brazilian territory, commanded by captain Charles-Louis Lunier.

The invasion was repelled by the honorary general of the Brazilian army Francisco Xavier da Veiga Cabral.

International response 
After the military confrontation the territorial dispute was settled by an international court on 27 December 1897. The decision was favorable to Brazil, which maintained control over the disputed region.

Walter Hauser, president of Switzerland, served as arbitrator. On 1 December 1900 Hauser issued a report favoring Brazil.

See also 
 Brazil–France relations

References 

Brazil–France border
First Brazilian Republic